Soyuz TM-27 was a Russian spaceflight that ferried cosmonauts and supplies to the Russian space station Mir. It was the 33rd expedition to Mir. It was launched by a Soyuz-U rocket from Baikonur Cosmodrome on January 29, 1998. The main mission was to exchange one crew member, carry out French mission PEGASE, and conduct routine science experiments.

TM-27 docked with Mir. The crew repaired the Spektr solar panel and installed a new VDU station orientation system.

Crew

Mission accomplishments
Docked with Mir
Exchange part of crew
Carried out French mission PEGASE
Conducted routine science experiments

EVA schedule
03.03.1998 aborted due to faulty hatch
01.04.1998 (6h 40m)
06.04.1998 (4h 23m)
11.04.1998 (6h 25m)
17.04.1998 (6h 32m)
22.04.1998 (6h 21m)
Over the course of these 5 walks, the cosmonauts repaired the Spektr solar panel and installed a new VDU station orientation system.

Mission notes
Both cosmonauts and astronaut Andy Thomas (arrived on STS-89) became the 25th resident crew. Eyharts landed on 19.02.1998 with Soyuz TM-26-spacecraft. Included astronaut from France.

Crewed Soyuz missions
Spacecraft launched in 1998
Spacecraft which reentered in 1998